This is a partial list of Central European countries by development indexes such as the Globalisation index, Human Development Index, Press Freedom Index, Legatum Prosperity Index, EF English Proficiency Index, and other statistical measures and rankings.

The concept of what countries belong to Central Europe is not well-defined, so tables or lists below may show different countries listed.

Economy

Human Development Index

Countries in descending order of Human Development Index (2018 data):
 Switzerland: 0.944 (ranked 2)
 Germany: 0.936 (ranked 5)
 Liechtenstein: 0.916 (ranked 17)
 Austria: 0.908 (ranked 20)
 Slovenia: 0.896 (ranked 25)
 Czech Republic: 0.888 (ranked 27)
 Poland: 0.865 (ranked 33)
 Slovakia: 0.855 (ranked 38)
 Hungary: 0.838 (ranked 45)
 Croatia: 0.831 (ranked 46)
 Romania: 0.816 (ranked 52)
 Serbia: 0.787 (ranked 67)

Globalisation

The index of globalization in Central European countries (2016 data):

 Switzerland: 91.17 (ranked 1)
 Austria: 88.95 (ranked 7)
 Germany: 88.17 (ranked 8)
 Czech Republic: 85.19 (ranked 13)
 Hungary: 85.13 (ranked 14)
 Slovakia: 82.89 (ranked 21)
 Slovenia: 81.28 (ranked 25)
 Poland: 81.20 (ranked 26)
 Croatia: 80.90 (ranked 28)
 Romania: 79.99 (ranked 29)
 Serbia 78.34 (ranked 37)
 Liechtenstein: 54.37 (ranked 121)

Prosperity Index
Legatum Prosperity Index demonstrates an average and high level of prosperity in Central Europe (2018 data)
 Switzerland (ranked 4)
 Germany (ranked 11)
 Luxembourg (ranked 12)
 Austria (ranked 15)
 Slovenia (ranked 18)
 Czech Republic (ranked 27)
 Slovakia (ranked 32)
 Poland (ranked 33)
 Croatia (ranked 41)
 Hungary (ranked 46)
 Romania (ranked 47)
 Serbia (ranked 56)

Corruption

Most countries in Central Europe tend to score above the average in the Corruption Perceptions Index (2018 data):
 Switzerland (ranked 3, tied)
 Germany (ranked 11, tied)
 Austria (ranked 14, tied)
 Poland (ranked 36, tied)
 Slovenia (ranked 36, tied)
 Czech Republic (ranked 38, tied)
 Slovakia (ranked 57)
 Croatia (ranked 60)
 Hungary (ranked 64, tied)
 Romania (ranked 66)
 Serbia (ranked 87, tied)

Education
Central European countries are very literate. All of them have the literacy rate of 96% or over (for both sexes):

Languages
Languages taught as the first language in Central Europe are: Croatian, Czech, French, German, Hungarian, Italian, Polish, Romansh, Serbian, Slovak and Slovenian. The most popular language taught at schools in Central Europe as foreign languages are: English, German and French.
Proficiency in English is ranked as high or moderate, according to the EF English Proficiency Index:
Slovenia (position 6)
Luxembourg (position 8)
Poland (position 9)
Austria (position 10)
Germany (position 11)
Serbia (position 18)
Hungary (position 21)
Czech Republic (position 18)
Switzerland (position 19)
Slovakia (position 25)
Croatia (not ranked)
Liechtenstein (not ranked)

Other languages, also popular (spoken by over 5% as a second language):
Croatian in Slovenia (61%)
French in Romania (17%), Germany (14%) and Austria (11%)
German in Slovenia (42%), Croatia (34%), Slovakia (22%), Poland (20%), Hungary (18%), the Czech Republic (15%) and Romania (5%)
Hungarian in Romania (9%), Serbia (7%) Slovakia (12%)
Italian in Croatia (14%), Slovenia (12%), Austria (9%) and Romania (7%)
Russian in Poland (28%), Slovakia (17%), the Czech Republic (13%) and Germany (6%)
Polish in Slovakia (5%)
Slovak in the Czech Republic (16%), Serbia (2%)
Spanish in Romania (5%)

Education performance
Student performance has varied across Central Europe, according to the Programme for International Student Assessment. In the last study, countries scored medium, below or over the average scores in three fields studied.

In maths:

 Liechtenstein (position 8) – above the OECD average
 Switzerland (position 9) – above the OECD average
 Poland (position 14) – above the OECD average
 Germany (position 16) – above the OECD average
 Austria (position 18) – above the OECD average
 Slovenia (position 21) – above the OECD average
 Czech Republic (position 24) – similar to the OECD average
 Slovakia (position 35) – below the OECD average
 Hungary (position 39) – below the OECD average
 Croatia (position 40) – below the OECD average
 Serbia (position 43) – below the OECD average

In the sciences:

 Poland (position 9) – above the OECD average
 Liechtenstein (position 10) – above the OECD average
 Germany (position 12) – above the OECD average
 Switzerland (position 19) – above the OECD average
 Slovenia (position 20) – above the OECD average
 Czech Republic (position 22) – above the OECD average
 Austria (position 23) – similar to the OECD average
 Hungary (position 33) – below the OECD average
Serbia (position 34) – below the OECD average
 Croatia (position 35) – below the OECD average
 Slovakia (position 40) – below the OECD average

In reading:

 Poland (position 10) – above the OECD average
 Liechtenstein (position 11) – above the OECD average
 Switzerland (position 17) – above the OECD average
 Germany (position 19) – above the OECD average
 Czech Republic (position 26) – similar to the OECD average
 Austria (position 27) – below the OECD average
 Hungary (position 33) – below the OECD average
 Croatia (position 35) – below the OECD average
 Slovenia (position 38) – below the OECD average
Serbia (position 49) – below the OECD average

Higher education

Universities

The first university east of France and north of the Alps was the Charles University in Prague established in 1347 or 1348 by Charles IV, Holy Roman Emperor and modeled on the University of Paris, with the full number of faculties (law, medicine, philosophy and theology). The list of Central Europe's oldest universities in continuous operation, established by 1500, include (by their dates of foundation):
Czech Republic Charles University in Prague, Czech Republic (1348)
Poland Jagiellonian University in Kraków, Poland (1364)
Austria University of Vienna in Vienna, Austria (1365)
Hungary University of Pécs in Pécs, Hungary (1367)
Germany Heidelberg University in Heidelberg, Germany (1386)
Germany Cologne University in Cologne, Germany (1388)
Croatia University of Zadar in Zadar, Croatia (1396)
Germany University of Leipzig in Leipzig, Germany (1409)
Germany University of Rostock in Rostock, Germany (1419)
Germany University of Greifswald in Greifswald, Germany (1456)
Germany University of Freiburg in Freiburg, Germany (1457)
Switzerland University of Basel in Basel, Switzerland (1460)
Germany Ludwig Maximilian University of Munich in Munich, Germany (1472)
Germany University of Tübingen in Tübingen, Germany (1477)

Regional exchange program
Central European Exchange Program for University Studies (CEEPUS) is an international exchange program for students and teachers teaching or studying in participating countries. Its current members include (year it joined for the first time in brackets):
Albania (2006)
Austria (2005)
Bosnia and Herzegovina (2008)
Bulgaria (2005)
Croatia (2005)
Czech Republic (2005)
Hungary (2005)
Kosovo* (2008)
Macedonia (2006)
Moldova (2011)
Montenegro (2006)
Poland (2005)
Romania (2005)
Serbia (2005)
Slovakia (2005)
Slovenia (2005)

Culture and society

Architecture
Central European architecture has been shaped by major European styles including but not limited to: Brick Gothic, Rococo, Secession (art) and Modern architecture. Seven Central European countries are amongst those countries with higher numbers of World Heritage Sites:
Germany (position 5th, 42 sites)
Poland (position 18th, 16 sites)
Czech Republic (position 22nd, 12 sites)
Switzerland (position 25th, 12 sites)
Austria (position 27th, 10 sites)
Croatia (position 29th, 10 sites)
Hungary (8 sites)
Serbia (position 35th, 6 sites)

Media

There is a whole spectrum of media active in the region: newspapers, television and internet channels, radio channels, internet websites etc.
Central European media are regarded as free, according to the Press Freedom Index, although the situation in Poland, Hungary and Croatia is described as "problematic". Some of the top scoring countries in the Press Freedom Index are in Central Europe, and include:
Switzerland (position 7)
Austria (position 11)
Germany (position 16)
Slovakia (position 17)
Czech Republic (position 23)
Liechtenstein (position 32)
Slovenia (position 37)
Romania (position 43)
Poland (position 54)
Hungary (position 71)
Croatia (position 74)
Serbia (position 76)

Politics

Democracy 

European countries score very highly in the Democracy Index:
 Switzerland (position 6)
 Germany (position 13)
 Austria (position 14)
 Czech Republic (position 25)
 Slovenia (position 37)
 Poland (position 40)
 Slovakia (position 45)
 Croatia (position 50)
 Hungary (position 51)
Serbia (position 57)
 Romania (position 61)
 Liechtenstein (not listed)

Global Peace Index

In spite of its turbulent history, Central Europe is currently one of world's safest regions. Most Central European countries are in top 20%:
 Austria (position 3)
 Switzerland (position 5)
 Czech Republic (position 11)
 Slovenia (position 14)
 Germany (position 17)
 Slovakia (position 19)
 Poland (position 23)
 Hungary (position 22)
Serbia (position 23)
 Romania (position 24)
 Croatia (position 26)
 Liechtenstein (not listed)

See also 
 American Human Development Project
 Central and Eastern Europe
 Central European Initiative
 Democracy Index
 East-Central Europe
 Global Peace Index
 List of African countries by Human Development Index
 List of sovereign states in Europe by Human Development Index
 List of sovereign states in Asia and Oceania by Human Development Index
 List of countries by Human Development Index
 List of countries by Human Development Index by region
 Mitteleuropa
 Organization for Security and Co-operation in Europe statistics

References 

 
Regions of Europe
Europe geography-related lists